Gunay Uslu (born 25 October 1972) is a Dutch cultural historian and politician, who has served as State Secretary for Culture and Media in the fourth Rutte cabinet since 10 January 2022. She is a member of the Democrats 66 (D66) party.

Early life and education 
Uslu was born in 1972 in Haarlem, North Holland as the daughter of Turkish immigrants. She attended her secondary education between 1985-1992 at the Montessori Lyceum Amsterdam, where she completed the MAVO and HAVO curricula. After obtaining propaedeutic diplomas in teacher education from the Amsterdam University of Applied Sciences in 1993 and in Dutch law from the University of Amsterdam in 1996, she studied cultural studies at the University of Amsterdam and obtained an MA degree in 2001, specializing in the policy and management of European cultural history. In 2015, she obtained a PhD degree in History, Art History, and Archaeology from the same university.

Career 
From 1997 to 1999 and from 2014 to 2020, Uslu held management positions at the Corendon Tourism Group, which was co-founded by her brother Atilay. Between 2001 and 2018, she taught several courses at the University of Amsterdam, including heritage studies, museology and cultural policy. Uslu has also worked for the Rijksmuseum and has been the curator of exhibitions at, among others, the Allard Pierson Museum and Amsterdam Museum.

On 10 January 2022, she joined the fourth Rutte cabinet as State Secretary for Culture and Media, on behalf of the Democrats 66.

References 

1972 births
Living people
21st-century Dutch historians
21st-century Dutch politicians
21st-century Dutch women politicians
Democrats 66 politicians
Dutch people of Turkish descent
Cultural historians
People from Haarlem
State Secretaries for Education of the Netherlands
University of Amsterdam alumni
Academic staff of the University of Amsterdam